7119 Hiera  is a large Jupiter trojan and potentially slow rotator from the Greek camp, approximately  in diameter. It was discovered on 11 January 1989, by American astronomer couple Carolyn and Eugene Shoemaker at Palomar Observatory in California. The dark Jovian asteroid belongs to the 60 largest Jupiter trojans and has an estimated rotation period of at least 400 hours. It was named for the Amazon Hiera, who fought against the Greeks in the Trojan War. As with 624 Hektor, the naming for this Jovian asteroid was placed into the wrong camp.

Orbit and classification 

Hiera is a dark Jovian asteroid orbiting in the leading Greek camp at Jupiter's  Lagrangian point, 60° ahead of its orbit in a 1:1 resonance . It is also a non-family asteroid in the Jovian background population.

It orbits the Sun at a distance of 4.6–5.7 AU once every 11 years and 8 months (4,271 days; semi-major axis of 5.15 AU). Its orbit has an eccentricity of 0.10 and an inclination of 19° with respect to the ecliptic. A first precovery was taken at the discovering observatory in November 1987, extending the body's observation arc by 14 months prior to its official discovery observation at Palomar.

Physical characteristics 

Hiera is an assumed, carbonaceous C-type asteroid, while its V–I color index of 0.95 is typical for most Jovian D-type asteroids.

Suspected slow rotator 

In June 2009, Hiera was observed by Italian astronomer Stefano Mottola at the Spanish Calar Alto Observatory during 5 consecutive nights. Although a lightcurve could not be obtained and a systematic instrumental error could not be ruled out, the body displayed a slowly, ever decreasing brightness of 0.1 in magnitude, which would translate into a rotation period of at least 400 hours. This would make Hiera a slow rotator. As of 2018, no secure period has been obtained.

Diameter and albedo 

According to the surveys carried out by the NEOWISE mission of NASA's Wide-field Infrared Survey Explorer, the Infrared Astronomical Satellite IRAS, and the Japanese Akari satellite, Hiera measures between 59.15 and 77.29 kilometers in diameter and its surface has an albedo between 0.036 and 0.067. The Collaborative Asteroid Lightcurve Link derives an albedo of 0.0398 and a diameter of 76.45 kilometers based on an absolute magnitude of 9.7.

Naming 

This minor planet was named after Hiera from Greek mythology, a female general in the Trojan war. However, her name was removed from Homer's Iliad, as to not diminish the greatness of Helen of Troy, the daughter of Zeus and cause for the Trojan war (also see 101 Helena). The official naming citation was published by the Minor Planet Center on 4 May 1999. Although the asteroid resides in the Greek camp, the citation describes Hiera as a general of the Mysians, who fought on the Trojan, not the Greek side in the Trojan War.

References

External links 
 Asteroid Lightcurve Database (LCDB), query form (info )
 Dictionary of Minor Planet Names, Google books
 Discovery Circumstances: Numbered Minor Planets (5001)-(10000) – Minor Planet Center
 Asteroid 7119 Hiera at the Small Bodies Data Ferret
 
 

007119
Discoveries by Carolyn S. Shoemaker
Discoveries by Eugene Merle Shoemaker
Named minor planets
19890111